James Adarryl Tapp Jr. (September 9, 1977 – November 26, 2003), better known by his stage name Soulja Slim, was an American rapper and songwriter. He is perhaps best known for featuring on the U.S. number one hit "Slow Motion".

Early life
James A'Darryl Tapp Jr. was born in New Orleans on September 9, 1977, to James and Linda Tapp. He was raised in the Magnolia Projects in New Orleans and attended Cohen Senior High School before dropping out of school in the 11th grade. He began selling drugs, as well as forming an addiction to heroin and cocaine. By 1993, he was rapping as "Magnolia Slim" in venues and block parties in the projects. His first recordings, however, would be on Parkway Pumpin', an independent label run by legendary producer KLC and also featuring 39 Posse, Fiend, Mac, Mystikal Mike (later Mystikal), Mr. Serv-On and Da Hound. Soulja Slim's solo debut Soulja Fa Lyfe was released in 1994 by Parkway Pumpin' and Hype Enough Records. The album did well, selling 90,000 units independently. In 1995, he released the four-song EP Darkside on Hype Enough Records.

Career

No Limit Records and Slow Motion (1997–2003)
In the same year, the song "You Got It" appeared on a No Limit Records double-CD compilation Down South Hustlers: Bouncin' and Swingin' . In 1998, Tapp, now calling himself Soulja Slim, released Give It 2 'Em Raw on No Limit, which featured singles "Street Life" and "From What I Was Told," the latter also produced as a music video. The album debuted at number 13 on the Billboard 200 and sold 82,000 in the first week. At that time, Soulja Slim was convicted of armed robbery and incarcerated. He reappeared three years later with The Streets Made Me, which was again released on the No Limit label. From there, he started his own label, Cut Throat Comitty Records and released Years Later in late 2002. In 2003, he released Years Later...A Few Months After, his last album before his death. The album featured the song "I'll Pay for It". In 2003, he also collaborated with fellow New Orleans rapper Juvenile to make the song "Slow Motion". The song was released on Juvenile's album Juve the Great and reached the number one spot on the Billboard Hot 100. It was Soulja Slim and Juvenile's first number one hit, and as the song was released after Soulja Slim's death he became only the sixth artist to have a posthumous number one song.

Death
Tapp died on November 26, 2003, after an assailant shot him four times, three in the face and once in the chest, on the front lawn of the home of his mother and stepfather, Phillip "Tuba Phil" Frazier of Rebirth Brass Band, in the Gentilly neighborhood. Tapp was buried with his Cut Throat Comitty charm and jewelry, and the outfit he wore on the cover of Give It 2 'Em Raw.

On December 31, 2003, police arrested 22-year-old Garelle Smith in connection with Tapp's murder. Police discovered a stolen police pistol in Smith's possession with a scratched-off serial number. A ballistics test matched bullets from that gun to the ones that killed Tapp, but no witnesses would testify against him. By 2008, Smith had been arrested for three more murders, and, in each case, charges were dropped and he was released due to lack of witnesses and the New Orleans 60-day law. Smith's murders, including that of Tapp, became cold cases. Smith himself was found shot to death on August 13, 2011.

Discography

Studio albums

Mixtapes

Compilation
 1999: Hype Enough Records: Limited Edition
 2005: Greatest Hitz

Singles

As lead artist

As featured artist

See also

 List of murdered hip hop musicians
 List of unsolved murders

References

External links
 

1977 births
2003 deaths
2003 murders in the United States
African-American male rappers
American robbers
Deaths by firearm in Louisiana
Gangsta rappers
Murdered African-American people
No Limit Records artists
People murdered in Louisiana
Rappers from New Orleans
Southern hip hop musicians
Unsolved murders in the United States
20th-century American male musicians
20th-century African-American musicians
21st-century African-American people
Hardcore hip hop artists